

Predicted and scheduled events 
 January 1 – Bulgaria is expected to adopt the euro and become the 21st member state of the eurozone.
 January 8–February 2 – The 2025 World Men's Handball Championship will be held in Croatia, Denmark and Norway.
 January 20 – The president-elect of the 2024 United States presidential election is scheduled to be inaugurated.
 January 24 – The next UK general election will be held no later than this date.
 May – The 2025 Eurovision song contest is scheduled, with the location typically determined by the 2024 winner.
 May 12 – The 2025 general election is scheduled to take place in the Philippines.
 May–November 23 – Expo 2025 will be held in Osaka, Japan.   
 October 20 – The 45th Canadian federal election will be held no later than this date.
 October–November – The 2025 Rugby League World Cup will be held in France.
 October 26 – Germany will hold its next federal election.

Date unknown 

 The 2025 Polish presidential election is scheduled to be held.
 Planned ecumenical meeting of the Orthodox and Catholic Churches at Nicaea (İznik, Turkey) to mark the 1,700th anniversary of the Council of Nicaea.
 Norway plans to ban the sale of all new diesel and petrol cars by this year.
 Pakistan will host 2025 ICC Champions Trophy.
 ITER's first plasma will occur.

References